The Ghost Stories Tour was the sixth concert tour undertaken by British rock band Coldplay. It was announced on 17 April 2014 in support of their sixth studio album, Ghost Stories, and marked a return to live performing at more intimate venues following the stadium, arena and festival shows from Mylo Xyloto Tour (2011–12). The band performed all songs from the album's standard version and some of their previous material. Concerts began on 25 April 2014 at Germany's E-Werk and ended at the BMW Welt (in the same country) on 6 December 2014, being noted for combining live and pre-recorded content for small settings. 

Only three dates had an opening act, with SZA, London Grammar and AlunaGeorge supporting the Beacon Theatre, Royce Hall and Royal Albert Hall concerts, respectively. The tour was met with generally positive reviews from music critics, who praised the production and how Coldplay connected with the audience. Following its ending, the band released Ghost Stories Live 2014, which included music videos for "Always in My Head", "All Your Friends" and "Ghost Story" in its physical editions and was nominated for Best Music Film at the 57th Annual Grammy Awards. Overall, the concert run grossed $3.09 million from 29,129 tickets sold.

Background
During the Australian leg of the Mylo Xyloto Tour, lead singer Chris Martin told attendees at Brisbane's Suncorp Stadium they "wouldn't play another big show for a few years". After the release of "Midnight" and "Magic", the first two singles from Ghost Stories (2014), the band announced they would not be making a full tour for the album. Martin joked it was because they "couldn't afford it". Upcoming songs were later performed at the iTunes Festival and Coldplay held a one-off performance at Culver City's Sony Studios as well. On 17 April 2014, they announced a set of six intimate shows: three in Europe, two in the United States and one in Japan. A second date in London was scheduled due to high demand. Months later, the band made tickets available for a performance in Australia, while a final show in Germany was announced to celebrate the upcoming release of Ghost Stories Live 2014.

Opening acts
The tour included supporting acts in only three dates: the first of them was American singer SZA at the Beacon Theatre in New York City, on 5 May 2014. She stated during an interview for Radio.com that "I can't even believe that was an opportunity or an option. I don't know why you would waste an opening slot on me". English band London Grammar then opened the Royce Hall concert on 19 May 2014. Lead singer Hannah Reid later commented talking with Martin was the "first time [she was] given any really excellent advice" about protecting her voice before shows and how to handle tensions in a group. Meanwhile, electronic duo AlunaGeorge were chosen to play songs from their debut album, Body Music (2013), in the two performances at Royal Albert Hall between 1 and 2 July 2014. They became a supporting act for A Head Full of Dreams Tour (2016–17) as well.

Concert synopsis

The band used a different set list for every show and, unlike previous tours, did not divided them into sections. For the performance at Sony Studios (which was later released on Ghost Stories Live 2014), they played singles "Paradise" and "Clocks"; followed them with all standard edition tracks from the tour's namesake album in order; and finished the concert with "Viva la Vida" and "Fix You". The remaining shows contained between 15 and 20 songs, combining Coldplay's back catalogue with their current material. With exception of "Another's Arms" and "O", all tracks from the new album were played in every tour date.

Martin also stated they would be trying to incorporate a few rarities and fan favorites. During the song "Midnight", him and Guy Berryman performed with a laser harp, while Will Champion used a reactable. The latter accompanied the singer in "O" by providing "subtle guitar licks", as track was mostly played solo on the piano. In the Royal Albert Hall, Coldplay had a circular stage said to be particularly close to the audience. For their show in Sydney, the band invited Kylie Minogue to perform "Can't Get You Out of My Head" and a cover of "Where the Wild Roses Grow" by Nick Cave. The last concert from the tour saw them play "Christmas Lights".

Reception
According to Gigwise, tickets for the first Royal Albert Hall show went sold out within minutes of availability, which led the band to announce a second date. Similar demand was registered in Enmore Theatre. Overall, they grossed $3,092,008 from 29,129 tickets. The tour also received generally positive reviews from music critics: Robert Altman from Consequence said Coldplay "are cohesive enough to rival the most skilled musicians in the industry", adding "what separates them from any studio performer is Martin's light stage banter and ability to connect with a multi-generational audience". The Hollywood Reporter Roy Trakin stated they "turn heartbreak into transcendence, which is what all great artists do". Writing for The Guardian, Ian Gittins commented the band "always majored in empathy, and the sympathy vote being extended towards Martin tonight is palpable". Greg Inglis from DIY praised their confidence and emphasized it is "often overlooked how versatile Coldplay are", as Champion was taking piano duties.

Live album

Following the end of the tour, the band released Ghost Stories Live 2014, their fourth live album. It consisted of a CD with selected renditions of each song from the original studio album and a recording of their Sony Studios performance directed by Paul Dugdale. Martin described it as "a very special moment for our band" and added the film was "basically our original vision" for the project. Bonus content included the director's cut for "Magic" and three new music videos: "All Your Friends", a tribute to those who fought in the First World War; "Always in My Head", an animated version of the album cover; and "Ghost Story", which featured fading black and white shots of the band performing. Additionally, the second had an alternative concert take, along with "Oceans". Meanwhile, the Japanese CD edition included the tour's recording of "Viva la Vida". In 2014, the band received a Best Music Film nomination at the 57th Annual Grammy Awards for the project, ultimately losing to 20 Feet from Stardom.

Set lists
{{hidden
| expanded = true
| headercss = background: #FFE6FF; font-size: 100%; width: 100%;
| contentcss = text-align: left; font-size: 100%; width: 100%;
| header = Royce Hall – Los Angeles, United States
| content =

"Atlas"
"Charlie Brown"
"The Scientist"
"Don't Panic"
"A Whisper"
"Til Kingdom Come"
"Viva la Vida"
"Paradise"
"Always in My Head"
"Magic"
"Ink"
"True Love"
"Midnight"
"Another's Arms"
"Oceans"
Encore
"A Sky Full of Stars"
"Yellow"
"O"

}}
{{hidden
| headercss = background: #FFE6FF; font-size: 100%; width: 100%;
| contentcss = text-align: left; font-size: 100%; width: 100%;
| header = Royal Albert Hall – London, England
| content =

"Always in My Head"
"Charlie Brown"
"Paradise"
"Magic"
"Clocks"
"The Scientist"
"God Put a Smile Upon Your Face"
"Til Kingdom Come"
"Don't Panic"
"Everything's Not Lost"
"Ink"
"True Love"
"Viva la Vida"
"Midnight"
"Every Teardrop Is a Waterfall"
Encore
"Oceans"
"A Sky Full of Stars"
"Fix You"

}}

Tour dates

See also
 List of Coldplay live performances
 List of highest-grossing live music artists

Notes

References

External links
Coldplay Official Website

2014 concert tours
Coldplay concert tours
Concert tours of Asia
Concert tours of Australia
Concert tours of Europe
Concert tours of France
Concert tours of Germany
Concert tours of Japan
Concert tours of North America
Concert tours of Oceania
Concert tours of the United Kingdom
Concert tours of the United States